Esslingen is an electoral constituency (German: Wahlkreis) represented in the Bundestag. It elects one member via first-past-the-post voting. Under the current constituency numbering system, it is designated as constituency 261. It is located in central Baden-Württemberg, comprising the northern part of the Esslingen district.

Esslingen was created for the inaugural 1949 federal election. Since 2002, it has been represented by Markus Grübel of the Christian Democratic Union (CDU).

Geography
Esslingen is located in central Baden-Württemberg. As of the 2021 federal election, it comprises municipalities of Aichwald, Altbach, Baltmannsweiler, Deizisau, Denkendorf, Esslingen am Neckar, Hochdorf, Köngen, Lichtenwald, Neuhausen auf den Fildern, Ostfildern, Plochingen, Reichenbach an der Fils, Wendlingen am Neckar, and Wernau from the Esslingen district.

History
Esslingen was created in 1949, then known as Eßlingen. It acquired its current name in the 1980 election. In the 1949 election, it was Württemberg-Baden Landesbezirk Württemberg constituency 6 in the numbering system. In the 1953 through 1961 elections, it was number 168. In the 1965 through 1976 elections, it was number 171. In the 1980 through 1998 elections, it was number 165. In the 2002 and 2005 elections, it was number 262. Since the 2009 election, it has been number 261.

Originally, the constituency comprised the Eßlingen district and the municipalities of Aichtal, Altdorf, Altenriet, Bempflingen, Beuren, Erkenbrechtsweiler, Frickenhausen, Grafenberg, Großbettlingen, Nürtingen, Neuffen, Kohlberg, Neckartailfingen, Neckartenzlingen, Oberboihingen, Schlaitdorf, and Unterensingen from the Nürtingen district. In the 1965 through 1976 elections, it was coterminous with the Eßlingen district. It acquired its current borders in the 1980 election.

Members
The constituency has been held by the Christian Democratic Union (CDU) during all but four Bundestag terms since its creation. It was first represented by Franz Ott from 1949 to 1953; Ott was one of three independents elected to the first Bundestag. Thomas Ruf of the CDU won it in 1953 and served until 1972, when Volker Hauff of the Social Democratic Party (SPD) was elected. Gerd Langguth regained it for the CDU in 1976, but Hauff was elected again in 1980. Otto Hauser won it for the CDU in 1983 and served until 1998, when Siegmar Mosdorf of the SPD was elected. Markus Grübel of the CDU has been representative since 2002.

Election results

2021 election

2017 election

2013 election

2009 election

References

Federal electoral districts in Baden-Württemberg
1949 establishments in West Germany
Constituencies established in 1949
Esslingen (district)